Badger is an unincorporated community in Benton County, Washington, United States, located  approximately three miles southwest of Richland, near Badger Springs and Badger Canyon.

The community was established in 1883 and named by the Northern Pacific Railway Company because of spring water that was found flowing out of a badger hole. The community had a school in 1907, as well as a post office and a store a few years later.

References

Unincorporated communities in Benton County, Washington
Northern Pacific Railway
Unincorporated communities in Washington (state)